Sarcheshmeh or Sar Cheshmeh or Sarchashmeh may also refer to:

Mes-e Sarcheshmeh, a city in Iran
Cheshmeh Kabud, Mirbag-e Shomali, Iran, also known as Sarcheshmeh-ye Kabud
Sar Cheshmeh, Ghor, Afghanistan
Sar Chesmeh, Wardak, Afghanistan
Sar Cheshmeh, Bushehr, Iran
Sar Cheshmeh, East Azerbaijan, Iran
Sarcheshmeh, Hashtrud, a village in East Azerbaijan Province, Iran
Sar Cheshmeh, Fars, Iran
Sar Cheshmeh, Gilan, Iran
Sar Cheshmeh, Golestan, Iran
Sar Cheshmeh, Isfahan, Iran
Sarcheshmeh, Jiroft, a village in Kerman Province, Iran
Sar Cheshmeh, Rabor, a village in Kerman Province, Iran
Sarcheshmeh Rural District, in Kerman Province, Iran
Sar Cheshmeh-ye Olya, a village in Khuzestan Province, Iran
Sar Cheshmeh-ye Sofla, a village in Khuzestan Province, Iran
Sarcheshmeh-ye Talkhab, a village in Khuzestan Province, Iran
Sarcheshmeh-ye Mushemi, a village in Kohgiluyeh and Boyer-Ahmad Province, Iran
Sar Cheshmeh, Kurdistan, a village in Kurdistan Province
Sar Cheshmeh, Kamyaran, a village in Kurdistan Province
Sar Cheshmeh, Chalus, a village in Mazandaran Province
Sar Cheshmeh, Kelardasht, a village in Mazandaran Province
Sar Cheshmeh, Bojnord, a village in North Khorasan Province, Iran
Sar Cheshmeh, Esfarayen, a village in North Khorasan Province, Iran
Sar Cheshmeh, Shirvan, a village in North Khorasan Province, Iran
Sar Cheshmeh, Razavi Khorasan, Iran
Sar Cheshmeh, Yazd, Iran
Sarcheshmeh-e Kamalvand, Iran
Sarcheshmeh, a copper mine in Iran